Jean Elizabeth Lowrie (October 11, 1918 – November 9, 2014) was an American librarian, educator, and president of the American Library Association from 1973 to 1974. She received a bachelor's degree from Keuka College in 1940 and a second bachelor's degree in library science from Western Reserve University in 1941.  She went on to receive a master's degree in elementary education from Western Michigan University in 1956 and her doctorate from Western Reserve University in 1959.

Her first library position was as a children's librarian in the Toledo Public Library. In 1944, she moved to Tennessee to serve as an elementary school librarian in Oak Ridge, Tennessee where she worked until 1951. Lowrie's next position was at Western Michigan University where she was librarian for the Campus School, a training school for future teachers. She became a faculty member at the WMU School of Librarianship in 1958. In 1963, she became Director of the program until her retirement in 1981.

Lowrie founded the International Association of School Librarianship to promote effective school librarianship and was the organization's first president from 1971 to 1977. She also served as its executive secretary from 1977 to 1996.

Publications
 "School libraries: international developments" (Scarecrow Press, 1972) 
 "Elementary school libraries" (Scarecrow Press, 1970)

References

 

1918 births
2014 deaths
American librarians
American women librarians
Presidents of the American Library Association
Case Western Reserve University alumni
Western Michigan University faculty
Western Michigan University alumni
Keuka College alumni
American women academics
21st-century American women